Breaking Amish is an American reality television series on the TLC television network that debuted September 9, 2012. The series revolves around five young Anabaptist adults (four Amish and one Mennonite) who move to New York City in order to experience a different life and decide whether to return to their communities or remain outside them and face ostracism by their families and friends. It follows the cast members as they experience life in New York and face new situations involving work, friendship, romance, and lifestyle, plus the drama that develops among cast members as they undergo various experiences.

The cast members' move to New York City differs from Rumspringa, the rite of passage in which some 16-year-old Amish are allowed to experience the outside world and to decide whether or not they wish to remain with their home communities.

A news report on February 25, 2013, stated that TLC had ordered a second season of Breaking Amish with the original cast. Breaking Amish: Brave New World is considered the second season by TLC.

A third season of Breaking Amish, entitled Breaking Amish: Los Angeles, debuted on July 21, 2013, with an entirely different cast. The only connections with the new cast and the original cast were Abe's brother Andrew Schmucker and Jeremiah's ex-girlfriend Iva being two of the main cast members.

A fourth and final season of the show entitled Breaking Amish: Brooklyn debuted on September 18, 2014, with a new cast as well. One of the cast members, Matt, would go on make appearances in the fifth season of the spinoff series Return to Amish.

Controversy
It has been reported that the relationships between cast members were portrayed falsely and that there were many inconsistencies between fact and the reality that was represented in the television program. The production has been forthcoming with some of the 'non-Amish' activities in the background of the cast. As episodes progressed, the production steadily revealed other aspects of the cast's past activities, including items not previously released as spoilers by other media outlets.

Some of the information shared on air by the cast during the production:

Season 1
 In episode 1 it is shown that Kate had spent time in Florida, driving and getting a DUI.
 In the extended version of episode 3 Jeremiah states that he was kicked out of the Amish three different times, dressing 'English' each time.  ('English' was typically used in the series to mean "non-Anabaptist.")
 In episode 6 Jeremiah states, when Abe talks about marrying Rebecca, that he was once married.
 In episode 7 Abe and Rebecca discuss how they used to sneak off – with her boyfriend and with others – to dress 'English' and go bowling.
 In episode 7 Rebecca discusses how Abe once moved to Kentucky and she to North Dakota, renewing their friendship when they returned to their Amish community.
 In episode 8 Sabrina discusses the fact that she had been married, in 2009, to a Mennonite man – and that marrying a best friend does not always work out.
 In episode 10 Rebecca states that she had been married directly after her 18th birthday in 2009 and divorced in July 2012. She also mentions that she has a daughter.
 In episode 12 the group discuss the fact that many Amish teenagers will sneak out and dress 'English', and so it is no surprise to find pictures of them, or many other teenage Amish, during excursions outside of the community.

Cast

Season 1

Season 2: Brave New World

Abe's mother Mary Schmucker, his little sister Katie Ann Schmucker and older brother Andy Schmucker are major recurring cast members this season
: Age at the time of filming.

Season 3: L.A.

Iva's boyfriend Sam is a recurring cast member this season
: Age at the time of filming.

Season 4: Brooklyn

Matt's wife Courtney and her mother Venus are recurring cast members this season : Age at the time of filming.

Episodes

Season 1 (2012)

Season 2: Brave New World (2013)
A subtitle is added to this season entitled: Brave New World. All of the cast members from the first season return as they relocate and reside in Pinecraft, a small neighborhood located within Sarasota, Florida where there is a community of ex-Amish and Amish.

Season 3: Los Angeles (2013)

Season 4: Brooklyn (2014)

See also
Amish in the City
Return to Amish

References

External links
Official site

2010s American reality television series
2012 American television series debuts
Amish in popular culture
English-language television shows
TLC (TV network) original programming
Television shows set in Los Angeles
Television shows set in New York City
Mennonitism in popular culture
2014 American television series endings